The 2011 Uzbek League season was the 20th season of top-level football in Uzbekistan since independence in 1992.

The draw for the 2011 Uzbek League season took place on December 16, 2010.

Bunyodkor were the defending champions from the 2010 campaign.

New Rules
The 5+1 format of foreign players has been reduced to 4+1.
If any team is found winning with the help of the referee (i.e. the team made some deals with the referee before the game), the team will lose 6 to 9 points.
If there are any riots during a game, then the team concerned will lose 3 points. 
Since there were too many coaches sacked in the last edition of the Uzbek League, now no club can fire their coach, except with the permission of the U.F.F.

Teams
Lokomotiv Tashkent and Xorazm FK Urganch were relegated in the last edition of the Uzbek League.

Managerial changes

Foreign players

Pre-season transfers

League table

Results

Top goalscorers

Best XI
Championat.uz released the all-star team of the Uzbek League for the season 2011.

References

Uzbekistan Super League seasons
1
Uzbek
Uzbek